Jujubinus guphili is a species of sea snail, a marine gastropod mollusk in the family Trochidae, the top snails.

Description
The height of the shell attains 6 mm.

Distribution
This marine species occurs off the Philippines.

References

External links
 

guphili
Gastropods described in 2006